Francisco de Orellana Airport  is an airport serving Puerto Francisco de Orellana (also known as Coca), the capital of Orellana Province in Ecuador.

The airport is within the town, running parallel to the Coca River. Runway length does not include a  displaced threshold on Runway 34.

The Coca VOR-DME (Ident: COV) and non-directional beacon (Ident: COC) are located on the field.

Airlines and destinations

See also
Transport in Ecuador
List of airports in Ecuador

References

External links 
OpenStreetMap - Coca
OurAirports - Coca
SkyVector - Coca

Airports in Ecuador
Buildings and structures in Pastaza Province